Raban of Helmstatt (born 1362) was a German clergyman and bishop for the Roman Catholic Diocese of Speyer. He was ordained in 1396. He was appointed bishop in 1430. He died in 1439.

References 

1362 births

1439 deaths
German Roman Catholic bishops